Josef Redtenbacher (March 13, 1810 – March 5, 1870) was an Austrian chemist born in Kirchdorf an der Krems, Upper Austria. He was a brother to entomologist Ludwig Redtenbacher (1814–1876).

He studied medicine and botany at the University of Vienna, and was influenced by the work of mineralogist Friedrich Mohs. After graduation, he remained in Vienna as an assistant to chemist Joseph Franz von Jacquin. He later travelled to Germany, where he studied mineralogy under Heinrich Rose in Berlin and organic chemistry with Justus von Liebig at the University of Giessen.

Subsequently, he became a professor of chemistry at the University of Prague, and in 1849, returned to Vienna as a successor to Adolf Martin Pleischl. Shortly before his death, he was planning, together with architect Heinrich von Ferstel, construction of a new university laboratory in Vienna. 

He is credited with the discoveries of acrolein and acrylic acid. He also performed important research involving the composition of taurine.

References

External links
 

1810 births
1870 deaths
People from Kirchdorf an der Krems
Austrian chemists
Academic staff of the University of Vienna